The Gardena Ronda Express is a funicular situated in the Val Gherdëina near Santa Cristina Gherdëina, connecting the Col Raiser lifts to the Sasslong/Ruacia and Ciampinoi lifts in northern Italy.

Trains 
Two funiculars operate on the system. Both were built by Gangloff, and the cable system was manufactured by Leitner Ropeways. The funicular trains each have four seating cabins capable of seating around 10 and standing around 25. The total capacity is 140 people per train.

Track 
The whole line runs in a tunnel, which connects two gondola lifts and through them two ski resorts.

History 
Planning started in 1990 and after some changes on the track to avoid buildings, construction started in 2003. With the line's opening in 2004, after nearly forty years without a railway (the Val Gardena Railway was closed in 1960), the valley has a train again.

See also 
 List of funicular railways

References

External links 
 Gardena Ronda Express

Funicular railways in Italy
Railway lines in Trentino-Alto Adige/Südtirol
Transport in South Tyrol
Railway lines opened in 2004
Underground funiculars
1200 mm gauge railways in Italy
Underground rapid transit in Italy